A by-election was held on 18 June 2021 for three vacant seats of the Assembly of Experts in Tehran Province, caused by death of Ebrahim Amini, Hashem Bathaie and Mohammad-Ali Taskhiri. It was held along with three other elections, including the presidential election, the city council election and the parliamentary by-election.

Like the by-election held the previous year, it was an uncontested election without presence of rival moderates who had won the 2016 election by a landslide. As expected, it resulted in victory of all three candidates supported by The Two Societies.

The number of invalid votes cast in the election and its turnout were not officially declared by the authorities.

Campaign 
Heydar Moslehi, Iran's former intelligence minister who ran as a candidate, tried to launch a high-profile campaign by giving controversial interviews. He made an embarrassment for the establishment when he revealed that he ordered the Guardian Council to disqualify Akbar Hashemi Rafsanjani from the 2013 presidential elections due to surveys showing he will win at least 60% of the votes.

Results

References 

Elections in Tehran
2020s in Tehran
Unopposed by-elections in Iran